King's Newnham (otherwise known as Newnham Regis) is a village and civil parish located just under  west of the town of Rugby and  east of Coventry. For population details see Church Lawford.  It is within the borough of Rugby and Warwickshire county council.

History
The village lost most of its population as a result of enclosures of the former Royal Manor. Its parish church, St Lawrence's, was built in the 12th century and partially demolished 1795–97. This left the mostly 16th-century tower and the church disused.
The five other listed buildings of the parish are very close relative to the distant northern parish border: Farm Building near Newnham Hall, The Laurels, Highfield House, Newnham Hall and Manor Farmhouse.

Today
For ecclesiastical purposes King's Newnham is joined with nearby Church Lawford from which it is separated by the Warwickshire Avon to the south.  The parish council meets and shares the community facilities of Church Lawford community hall.

References

External links

Its page in The Birmingham and Midland Society for Genealogy and Heraldry's website
Contact details for its Parish Meeting

Villages in Warwickshire